Interpol is the third extended play (EP) by American rock band Interpol. It was released on June 4, 2002, and was the band's first release on the Matador Records label.

Background
"PDA" is one of the oldest songs by Interpol and appeared on many of their early demos and EPs (including their first demo tape, the Fukd ID #3 EP and the Precipitate EP).

The same versions of "PDA" and "NYC" were later included on the band's first full-length, Turn On the Bright Lights, while "Specialist" was released as a bonus track on the album's 2005 reissue.

Release
Between the releases of the Interpol EP and Turn On the Bright Lights, Interpol released "PDA" as a promo single along with a music video directed by Christopher Mills.

The EP was originally made available for sale for $3.98 on Matador's website.

Reception
Interpol received much critical acclaim, and garnered the band a healthy amount of attention before the release of Turn On the Bright Lights. The EP also helped the band shed accusations of cloning early post-punk bands like Joy Division, establishing an individual sound that expanded upon rather than copied the band's influences.

Treble magazine rated the EP the 39th best single of the decade.

"PDA" was nominated for a MTV2 award in 2003 and is a playable track on Rock Band 2.

Track listing

Personnel
Interpol
 Paul Banks – lead vocals, rhythm guitar
 Daniel Kessler – lead guitar
 Carlos Dengler – bass, keyboards
 Sam Fogarino – drums, percussion

References

Interpol (band) EPs
2002 EPs